Danielle Rauen (born December 18, 1997) is a Brazilian para table tennis player. She competed at the 2016 Summer Paralympics, winning a bronze medal, and 2020 Summer Paralympics, in Women's team class 9–10, winning a bronze medal.

Life 
When she was five years old, she was diagnosed with juvenile rheumatoid arthritis which affected her joints in her hands, hips, knees and shoulder, she began table tennis in 2009 and started to play internationally in 2013.

Rauen has won international team titles with Bruna Costa Alexandre.

References

1997 births
Living people
People from Piracicaba
Paralympic table tennis players of Brazil
Table tennis players at the 2016 Summer Paralympics
Medalists at the 2016 Summer Paralympics
Brazilian female table tennis players
Paralympic medalists in table tennis
Paralympic bronze medalists for Brazil
Medalists at the 2015 Parapan American Games
Medalists at the 2019 Parapan American Games
Table tennis players at the 2020 Summer Paralympics
Sportspeople from São Paulo (state)
21st-century Brazilian women